The United States Senate Energy and Natural Resources Subcommittee on Public Lands and Forests is one of four subcommittees of the U.S. Senate Energy and Natural Resources Committee.

Jurisdiction
This subcommittee's jurisdiction includes oversight and legislative responsibilities for: public lands administered by the Bureau of Land Management and U.S. Forest Service including farming and grazing thereon, and wilderness areas; establishment of wildlife refuges on public lands and wilderness designation therein; military land withdrawals; reserved water rights; Alaska Native Claims Settlement Act; territorial affairs; national mining and minerals policy and general mining laws; surface mining, reclamation and enforcement; mining education and research; Federal mineral leasing; Outer Continental Shelf leasing; Naval oil shale reserves; National Petroleum Reserve–Alaska; and deep seabed mining.

Members, 118th Congress

See also
 U.S. House Natural Resources Subcommittee on National Parks, Forests and Public Lands
 U.S. House Natural Resources Subcommittee on Energy and Mineral Resources

External links
U.S. Senate Energy and Natural Resources Subcommittee on Public Lands, Forests, and Mining, official web site

Energy Senate Public Lands and Forests